This is part of a list of Statutes of New Zealand for the period of the Liberal Government of New Zealand up to and including part of the first year of the Reform Government of New Zealand

1890s

1890  

 Arbitration Act  Amended: 1915/38/52/98/2007
 Borough of Devonport Empowering and Endowment Act 
 Cattle Act 
 Children's Protection Act 
 Educational Reserves Leasing Act 
 Epsom and Mount Eden Reserve Act 
 Gimmerburn Forest Reserve Act 
 Gold Duty Abolition and Mining Property Rating Act 
 Horomona Paatu Land-grant Act 
 Kaimarama Land Act 
 Kihikihi Cemetery Reserve Leasing Act 
 Mercantile Agents Act 
 Native Schools Sites Act Extension 
 Naval Reserves Vesting Act 
 Oaths Act 
 Omaka Recreation Reserve Sale Act 
 Palmerston North Reserves Act  Amended: 1994
 Post and Telegraph Classification and Regulation Act 
 Primage Duty Act 
 Roman Catholic Lands Act Extension 
 School Committees Election Act 
 Stratford County Act 
 Timaru Charitable Aid Institution Vesting Act 
 Timaru Harbour Board Empowering Act 
 Todman Land-grant Act 
 Tuakitoto and Kaitangata Lakes Act  Amended: 1913/14
 Valpy Crown Grant Boundary Definition Act 
 Volunteer Drill-sheds and Lands Trustees Validation Act 
 Waiapu County Act 
 Wellington School of Design and Exchange Act 
 Westport-Ngakawau Railway Extension Act 
Plus 17 Acts amended

1891  

 Auckland Electric Lighting Act 
 Birds Nuisance Act 
 Book-purchasers Protection Act 
 Christchurch Electric Lighting Act 
 Coal-mines Act  Amended: 1908/09/10/14/15/19/20/22/24/27/33/35/36/37/41/47/49
 Educational Endowments and Reserves Exchange Act 
 Factories Act  Amended: 1902/10/16/36/45/53/56/61/66/69/71/72/73/78
 Greymouth Harbour Board Loan Act 
 Hamerton Pension Act 
 Hospital Trustees Act 
 Land and Income Assessment Act  Amended: 1912/13
 Legislative Council Act  Amended: 1915/16/18/20
 McCabe Land-grants Act 
 McLean Land Act 
 New Plymouth Hospital Act 
 New Zealand Bank Act  Amended: 1958
 Official and Colonial Defences Secrets Act 
 Palmerston North Hospital District Act 
 Palmerston North Hospital Land Sales Validation Act 
 Partnership Act 
 Promoters' and Directors' Liability Act 
 Public works Appropriation Act 
 Railways Authorisation and Management Act 
 Stratford County Districts Adjustment Act 
 Thames Recreation Reserve Sale Revivor Act 
 Thordon Esplanade Act 
 Trafalgar Park Purchasing Act 
 Truck Act 
 University of Otago Council Election Act 
 Wanganui Heads Signal-station Reserve Exchange Act 
 Wanganui River Trust Act  Amended: 1912/20/22
 Water-supply Act  Amended: 1913
 Wellington Botanic Garden Vesting Act 
 Wellington Boys' Institute Act 
 Wellington Chew's Lane Encroachment Act 
 Wellington Electric Lighting Act 
Plus 20 Acts amended

1892  

 Auckland University College Land Exchange Act 
 Contractors' and Workman's Lien Act 
 Cook and Waiapu Counties Property Adjustment Act 
 Dairy Industry Act  Amended: 1915/22/24/26/33/38/54/55/57/75/76/80/89/2000
 Dempsey Trust Act  Amended: 1951
 Hukarere Native Girls' School Act  Amended: 1927
 Kaihau Trust Money Act 
 Kaipo Reserve Act 
 Kaitangata Relief Fund Transfer Act 
 Land for Settlements Act  Amended: 1895/1901/27
 Land-tax and Income-tax Act 
 Manure Adulteration Act 
 Mere Taka Land-grant Act 
 Mount Ida Water-race Act 
 Napier Harbour Board Further Empowering Act 
 Napier Harbour Board Loan Act  Amended: 1937/39/51
 Napier Native Hostelry Site Sale Act 
 Native Land Purchases Act 
 Oamaru Harbour Board Advance Repayment Act 
 Oamaru Racecourse Trustees Empowering Act 
 Ocean Beach Public Domain Act  Amended: 1920
 Offensive Publications Act 
 Ohinemuri County Ridings Validation Act 
 Orakei Succession Further Investigation Act 
 Palmerston North Couthouse Site Sale Act 
 Palmerston North Hospital Vesting Act 
 Patea Harbour Endowment Act 
 Payment of Members Act 
 Petone Corporation Loan Empowering Act 
 Provincial Ordinances Act 
 Public Reserves Vesting and Sale Act  Amended: 1895/96
 Rohe Potae Investigation of Title Act 
 Servants' Registry Offices Act  Amended: 1960
 Shops and Shop-assistants Act 
 Te Aroha Recreation-ground and Racecourse Act 
 Unclaimed Lands Act 
 Waikouaita Reserves Act 
 Waiorongomai Bridge Act 
 Wanganui Harbour Board Endowment Sale Act 
 Wanganui Hospital Board Vesting Act 
 Wellington City Sanitation Loan Empowering Act 
 Wellington Corporation and Harbour Board Streets and Lands Act 
 Westland Churches, Schools, and Hospital Vesting Act 
 Westland, Grey, Inangahua, and Buller Counties Vehicle Licensing Act 
Plus 19 Acts amended

1893  

 Alcoholic Liquors Sale Control Act 
 Auckland Domain Vesting Act  Amended: 1986
 Auckland Hospital Reserves Exchange Act 
 Bank-note Issue Act 
 Cheviot County Act 
 Cheviot Estate Disposition Act 
 Cheviot Estate Payment Act 
 Civil Service Insurance Act 
 Civil Service Officers' Guarantee Act  Repealed: 1914
 Colliery Railways Vesting Act 
 Counties Vehicle Licensing Act 
 Criminal Code Act  Amended: 1901/05
 District of Palmerston North Hospital and Charitable Aid Board Empowering Act 
 Dunedin Garrison Hall Trustees Empowering Act 
 Electoral Act  Amended: 1934/37/40/45/48/50/51/53/54/58/59/60/63/65/67/69/71/72/74/75/76/77/79/80/81/83/85/86/87/89/90/91/92/93/95/96/2002/04/05/07
 G. W. Ell Empowering Act 
 Gore Electric Lighting Act 
 Halswell River Drainage District Act 
 Hawera Borough Council Enabling Act 
 Infant Life Protection Act 
 Kaiapoi Borough Corporation Vesting Act 
 Kaitangata Cemetery Site Sale Act 
 Kiwitea County Act 
 Kyngdon Land-grant Act 
 Land Drainage Act  Amended: 1894/98/1908/13/20/22/23/52/56/58/64/65/67/68/71/72/74/75/76/78/80/88
 Lyttelton Orphanage Lands Vesting Act 
 Magistrates' Courts Act  Amended: 1909/13/20/22/26/27/30/50/55/56/60/61/63/64/66/67/69/70/71/74/75/77/78
 Mahinapua Creek and Lake Reserves Act 
 Mangatu No. 1 Empowering Act 
 Mangawai Harbour Endowment Reserve Act 
 Mokoreta Cemetery Reserve Act 
 Native Land Court Certificates Confirmation Act 
 Native Land Purchase and Acquisition Act 
 Native Trusts and Claims Definition and Registration Act 
 Niramona Pini Land Act 
 Oamaru Loans Consolidation Act 
 St. Albans Public Library Transfer Act 
 Stock Act  Amended: 1913/27/30/38/50/52/54/55/56/57/58/59/60/61/62/63/64/65
 Submarine Telegraph Cables Protection Act 
 Tairua Land Act 
 Taranaki Relief Fund Distribution Act 
 Wanganui Harbour Board Act 
 Wanganui Hospital Board Empowering Act 
 William Robinson Estate Trusts Act 
Plus 25 Acts amended

1894  

 Abattoirs and Slaughterhouses Act 
 Bank Directors and Shares Transfer Act 
 Bank of New Zealand Share Guarantee Act 
 Bank Shareholders Act 
 Banking Act  Amended: 1914/21/35
 Borough of Oamaru Leasing Act 
 Companies' Accounts Audit Act 
 Designation of Districts Act  Amended: 1909
 Dunedin Loans Conversion Act 
 Dunedin Waterworks Account Act 
 Eketahuna Cemetery Reserve Act 
 Foreign Insurance Companies' Deposits Act  Amended: 1895/1910
 Gaming Act  Amended: 1910/14/15/20/24/49/50/53/55/59/60/61/62/63/64/65/67/68/70/71/72
 Government Advances to Settlers Act  Amended: 1908
 Greymouth Harbour Board Empowering Act  Amended: 1986
 Hamilton Domains Empowering Act 
 Hastings Borough Loan Validation and Empowering Act 
 Inangahua County Council Empowering Act 
 Income-tax Act 
 Indictable Offences Summary Jurisdiction Act  Amended: 1900/07
 Industrial Conciliation and Arbitration Act  Amended: 1901/03/04/05/08/10/11/13/20/21/22/24/27/28/32/36/37/39/43/47/51/53/56/58/60/61/62/63/64/65/66/67/68/69/70/72
 James Mitchell Trust Act 
 Jubilee Institute for the Blind Reserve Act 
 Kirikiri Native School Site Act 
 Lake Forsyth Drainage Act 
 Land-tax Act  Amended: 1921
 Lands Improvement and Native Lands Acquisition Act 
 Legitimation Act  Amended: 1921
 Levels County Act 
 Light and Air Act 
 Little Barrier Island Purchase Act 
 Middle District of New Zealand University College Act 
 Mining Districts Land Occupation Act 
 Mount St. John Reserve Act 
 Native Land Court Certificate Confirmation Act 
 Native Lands Claims and Boundaries Adjustment and Titles Empowering Act 
 New Zealand Consols Act 
 Ngaere and other Blocks Native Claims Adjustment Act 
 Pohangina County Act 
 Post and Telegraph Department Act 
 Public Trust Office Consolidation Act 
 Railways Authorisation Act 
 School Attendance Act 
 Sea-fisheries Act  Amended: 1903
 Taonui Branch Railway Act 
 Timaru Harbour District Rating Act 
 Timaru Harbour Reclamation Act 
 Tongariro National Park Act  Amended: 1927/48
 Waimakariri-Ashley Water-supply Board Loan Act 
 Wellington City Drainage Empowering Act 
 Westland County Council Enabling Act 
Plus 19 Acts amended

1895  

 Agricultural and Pastoral Statistics Act 
 Auckland and Parnell Endowment Lands Act 
 Auckland Harbour Board and Devonport Borough Exchange of Land Act 
 Bank of New Zealand and Banking Act 
 Customs Duties Reciprocity Act 
 Dunedin Drainage and Sewerage Act 
 Dunedin Loans Consolidation Act 
 Family Homes Protection Act 
 Fernhill Railway Purchasing Act 
 Hamilton Gasworks Act 
 Hawksbury Borough Council Reserve Vesting Act 
 Hikutaia No 1 Block Boundary Act 
 Horowhenua Block Act 
 Invercargill Corporation Reserve Exchange Act 
 Kaihu Valley Railway Extension Act 
 Local Authorities' Loans Conversion Act 
 Manual and Technical Elementary Instruction Act 
 Margarine Act  Amended: 1964/72/78/80
 Masterton Trust Lands Trust Empowering Act 
 Native Land Claims Adjustment Act 
 Native Townships Act  Amended: 1903/19
 New Zealand Institute of Journalists Act 
 Pastoral Tenants' Relief Act 
 Patea Foreshore Vesting Act 
 Poisons Importation and Carriage Act  Amended: 1902
 Public Securities Act 
 Public-School Teachers Incorporation and Court of Appeal Act 
 Puniu Reserves Sale Act 
 Reserves Disposal and Exchange Act 
 Sale of Goods Act  Amended: 1961/2003
 Threshing-machine Owners' Lien Act 
 Timaru Public Park and Garden Domain Reserve and Otipua Domain Reserve Vesting Act 
 Unclassified Societies' Registration Act 
 Uniforms Act 
 Wages Attachment Act 
 Waimate Municipal Reserves Act 
 Wellington Corporation and Hospital Contributors Exchange Act 
 Wilson Land Act 
Plus 41 Acts amended

1896  

 Aid to Public Works and Land Settlement Act 
 Alcoholic Liquors Inspection Act 
 Asiatic Restriction Act 
 Bishop Suter Art Gallery Trustees Act 
 Borough of Masterton Water-supply and Drainage-works Loan Empowering Act 
 Canterbury College and Canterbury Agricultural College Act  Amended: 1910/22
 Caversham Waterworks Account Act 
 Dunedin City Borrowing Act 
 Gisborne Harbour Board Empowering Act  Amended: 1953
 Government Railways Department Classification Act 
 Government Valuation of Land Act 
 Lake Forsyth Lands Vesting Act 
 Lyttelton Harbour Board Enlargement Act 
 Married Persons Summary Separation Act 
 Mataura Reserve Vesting Act 
 Mount Wellington Public Domain Board and Thomas Morrin Exchange of Land Act 
 Naval and Military Claims Settlement and Extinguishment Act 
 Ngatitoa Trust Act 
 Oamaru Harbour Board Leasing Act 
 Orchard and Garden Pests Act 
 Otago Boys' and Girls' High Schools Board Empowering Act 
 Photographic Copyright Act 
 Picton Recreation Reserve Act  Amended: 1921
 Poverty Bay Land and Deeds Registration Districts Act 
 Public Morgues Act 
 Railways Compensation Adjustment Act 
 Rating on Unimproved Value Act  Amended: 1903
 Registration of People's Claims Act 
 Reserves and Crown Lands Disposal and Enabling Act 
 St Albans Borough Council Special Loan Enabling Act 
 Tauranga Educational Endowment Reserves Act 
 The Electrical Motive-power Act 
 The Female Law Practitioners Act 
 The Greytown Trustees Empowering Act 
 Tobacco Excise Duties Act 
 Urewera District Native Reserve Act  Amended: 1909/10
 Waimakariri Harbour Board Land Act 
 Westport Harbour Board Loan Act 
Plus 35 Acts amended

1897  

 Awarua Seat Inquiry Act 
 Bluff Harbour Board Empowering Act 
 Borough of Lyttelton Corporation Enabling Act 
 Cyanide Process Gold-extraction Act 
 Government Emergency Loans to Local Bodies Act 
 Hawera Gasworks and Electric Lighting Act 
 Invercargill Racecourse Trustees Empowering Act 
 Joseph Houston Land-grant Act 
 Kapiti Island Public Reserve Act 
 Kohukohu Foreshore Reclamation Act 
 Lyttelton Harbour Board Loan Act 
 Members of the House of Representatives Disqualification Act 
 Napier Municipal Corporation and Napier Harbour Board Exchange of Lands Empower Act 
 Sunday Labour in Mines Prevention Act 
 Victoria College Act  Amended: 1914/23
 Wellington City Sanitation Loan Act 
 Wellington Education Board Transfer of Reserve Act 
Plus 19 Acts amended

1898  

 Admiralty House Act 
 Akitio County Act 
 Borough of Masterton Private Roads Act 
 Borough of Onehunga Water-supply Act 
 Canterbury College Powers Act 
 Clutha River Board Empowering Act 
 Clyde Recreation-ground Sale and Disposal Act 
 Divorce Act 
 Eketahuna County Act 
 Hannaton Church Site Act 
 Homing-pigeons Protection Act 
 Inebriates Institutions Act  Amended: 1902/03
 Johnsonville School Reserve Act 
 Kauri-Gum Industry Act 
 Little River Domain Board Empowering Act 
 Mairetahi Loan Conversion Act 
 McLean Motor-car Act 
 Municipal Franchise Reform Act 
 New Plymouth Borough Reserves and Street Exchanges Act 
 Old-age Pensions Act  Amended: 1901/02/08/09/10/11
 Onehunga Cemetery Act 
 Petone Corporation Lighting and Sanitation Loans Empowering Act 
 Port Chalmers Mechanics' Institute Reserves Vesting Act 
 Rabbit-proof Wire-netting Fences Act 
 Reserves, Endowments, and Crown and Native Lands Exchange, Sale, Disposal, and Act 
 Richmond Borough Council Empowering Act 
 Road Districts Validation Act 
 Shearers' Accommodation Act 
 Slander of Women Act 
 Stratford Electric Lighting Act 
 Thames Borough Loans Conversion Act 
 Unclaimed Moneys Act  Amended: 1958
 University of Otago Leases and Securities Act 
 Wairarapa North County Loan Act 
 Wairarapa South County Loan Act 
 Wairoa Harbour Board Empowering and Loan Act 
 Wanganui Hospital Board Empowering Act 1893 Extension Act 
 Wellington City Reclamation and Public Baths Act 
 Wellington Harbour Board and Corporation Empowering Act 
 Wellington Harbour Board Reclamation and Empowering Act 
 Wellington High Levels Tramway Act  Amended: 1935
Plus 19 Acts amended

1899  

 Auckland City Borrowing Act 
 Auckland Grammar School Act  Amended: 1928/55/66
 Borough of Port Chalmers Borrowing Act 
 Borough of Stratford Private Roads Act 
 Canterbury College and Canterbury Agricultural College Indemnity Act 
 Christchurch City Borrowing Act 
 Christchurch Domains Trust Indemnity Act 
 Cutten Trust Act 
 Employment of Boys or Girls without Payment Prevention Act 
 Gore Agricultural and Pastoral Association Empowering Act 
 Government Accident Insurance Act  Amended: 1924/62
 Heathcote Road District Sanitation Act 
 Immigration Restriction Act  Amended: 1908/10/20/23/31/33/35/51/58/59/60/61/62
 Invercargill Garrison Hall Trustees Empowering Act 
 Labour Day Act 
 Licensing Poll Regulation Act 
 Linwood and Woolston Boroughs Borrowing Act 
 Linwood Borough Loan Act 
 Local Government Voting Reform Act 
 Marlborough High School Act 
 Mauriceville County Act 
 Melrose Borough Gas Act 
 Municipal Franchise Reform Extension Act 
 Ohinemuri County Electric Power and Lighting Act 
 Pacific Cable Authorisation Act 
 Payment of Jurors Act 
 Police Provident Fund Act 
 Rotokare Domain Act 
 Stratford Borough Empowering Act 
 Te Aroha Borough Reserve Act 
 Thames Harbour Board Empowering Act 
 Wages Protection Act  Amended: 1983/85/91
 Wellington City Streets Act 
 Whakatane County Act 
Plus 19 Acts amended

1900s

1900  
 Alexandra Borough Race Enabling Act 
 Bank of New Zealand Officers' Guarantee and Provident Association Act 
 Borough of Rangiora Water-supply Act 
 British Investors in New Zealand Government Securities Act 
 Bubonic Plague Prevention Act 
 Canterbury College Empowering Act 
 Castlepoint County Act 
 Civil Service Examination Act 
 Coromandel Harbour Board Dissolution Act 
 Crown Tenants' Rent Rebate Act 
 Deceased Husband's Brother Marriage Act 
 Devonport Borough Enabling Act 
 Dunedin City and Suburban Tramways Act 
 Dunedin District Drainage and Sewerage Act  Amended: 1916/21/23/25/30/37/47/51/66/83
 Education Boards Election Act 
 Egmont National Park Act  Amended: 1927/33
 Gisborne Harbour Board Further Empowering Act 
 Greytown Electric Lighting and Loan Empowering Act 
 Hakataramea Public Hall Act 
 Hawera Borough Drainage Empowering Act 
 Hawera Borough Reserves Act 
 Hobson Bay Watershed Sewage Act 
 Hospitals and Charitable Aid Boards Act 
 Imprisonment for Debt Limitation Act  Amended: 1903/14/67/72/89
 Land for Settlements Consolidation Act 
 Manawatu Railway Purchasing Act 
 Manual and Technical Instruction Act 
 Maori Councils Act  Amended: 1903
 Maori Lands Administration Act  Amended: 1901
 Masterton County Act 
 Midland Authorised Area Land-settlement Act 
 Military Pensions Extension to Contingents Act 
 Mokau Harbour Board Act 
 Native Interpreters Classification Act 
 New Zealand Ensign Act 
 New Zealand Institute of Surveyors and Board of Examiners Act 
 Noxious Weeds Act  Amended: 1910/21/23/27/34/56/60/71
 Pacific Cable Act 
 Paeroa Gasworks Act 
 Pahiatua Gasworks Act 
 Public Contracts Act 
 Public-School Teachers' Salaries Act 
 Queenstown Electric Lighting Act 
 Rotorua Town Council Act 
 Shorthand Reporters Act  Amended: 1951
 Slaughtering and Inspection Act  Amended: 1910/18/27/30/34
 Supreme Court Judge Appointment Act 
 Testator's Family Maintenance Act  Amended: 1903
 Thames Borough Endowment Leasing Act 
 Thames Borough Waterworks Account Act 
 Trading-stamps Abolition and Discount-stamps Issue Act 
 Wellington City Betterment Act 
 Wellington City Leasing Act 
 Wellington Corporation Land Exchange Act 
 Westport-Ngakawau Railway Act 
 Workers' Compensation for Accidents Act  Amended: 1903
Plus 32 Acts amended

1901  
 Accident Compensation Act 
 Arbitration Court President Validation Act 
 Borough of Mataura Loan Validation Act 
 Borough of Mornington Tramways Act 
 Cemetery Trustees Validation and Appointment Act 
 Charitable Gifts Act 
 Charitable Institutions Rating Act 
 Chatham Islands County Act 
 City of Auckland Loans Consolidation and Auckland City Borrowing Acts Amendm Act 
 Cook and other Islands Government Act 
 Cornwall Park Duties Exemption Act 
 Cyanide Process Extension Act 
 Egmont County Act 
 Exportation of Arms Act 
 Featherston County Act 
 Flax Grading and Export Act 
 Gore Cemetery Reserve Vesting and Enabling Act 
 Government Advances to Settlers Extension Act 
 Greytown Reserves Vesting and Disposal Enabling Act 
 Inch-Clutha Road, River, and Drainage Act  Amended: 1921
 Invercargill Reserve Landing Act 
 Kairanga County Act 
 Kiwitea County Council Offices Act 
 Local Authorities Indemnity Act 
 Local Bodies' Goldfields Public Works and Loans Act 
 Lyttelton Borough Council Empowering Act 
 Manawatu Railway Sale and Purchase Empowering Act 
 Maori Antiquities Act 
 Masterton Public Park Management Act 
 Miners' Rights Fee Reduction Act 
 Money-lenders Act  Amended: 1933
 Mortgages of Land Act 
 Nurses Registration Act  Amended: 1920
 Opium Prohibition Act 
 Pariroa Native Reserve Act 
 Physical Drill in Public and Native Schools Act 
 Presbyterian Church of New Zealand Act 
 Remuera Waterworks Empowering Act 
 Reserves and other Lands Sale Disposal, and Enabling and Public Bodies Empow Act 
 Rhodes Trust Act 
 Rotorua Town Council Validation and Extension Act 
 Royal Visit Expenses Act 
 State Coal-mines Act  Amended: 1902
 Templeton Domain Board Empowering Act 
 Timber Export Act 
 Victoria College Site and Wellington College and Girls' High School and Well Act 
 Wesleyan Church Reserve Vesting Act 
 Westland and Nelson Coalfields Administration Act  Amended: 1926
 Woodville County Act 
Plus 27 Acts amended

1902  
 Accident Insurance Companies Act  Amended: 1972/77
 Balclutha Reserves and Empowering Act 
 Bluff Harbour Board Representation Act 
 Bluff Harbour Foreshore Reclamation and Leasing and Borrowing Act 
 Christchurch City Council Empowering Act 
 Christchurch Tramways District Act  Amended: 1912
 City of Christchurch Electric Power and Loan Empowering Act 
 Courthouse-sites Exchange Act 
 Dilworth Trustees Act 
 Dunedin Town Belt Roads Closing and Regulation Act  Amended: 1984
 East Coast Native Trust Lands Act  Amended: 1912
 Egmont County Districts Adjustment Act 
 Government Railways Superannuation Fund Act 
 Hawera Borough Betterment Act 
 Hawera County Electric Lighting Act 
 Hawera Hospital District Act 
 Land and Deeds Registration Districts Act 
 Land Titles Protection Act 
 Law Societies Act 
 Licensing Committees and Polls Act 
 Manual and Technician Instruction Act 
 Masterton Borough Betterment Act 
 Masterton Trustees Empowering Act 
 Methodist Church of Australasia in New Zealand Act 
 Midland Railway Petitions Settlement Act 
 Motor-cars Regulation Act 
 Mount Herbert County Act 
 Nelson City Streets and Reserves Act 
 New River Harbour Reclamation Act 
 North Canterbury Common Hospital Reserve Act 
 Oxford and Cust Road Districts Alteration of Boundaries Act 
 Pacific Cable Extension Act 
 Pahiatua County Council Empowering Act 
 Second-hand Dealers Act  Amended: 1934
 Solicitors' Bills of Costs Act 
 Statutes Compilation Act  Amended: 1915
 Towns Main Streets Act 
 Tukituki bridge Loans Act 
 University of Otago Empowering Act 
 Victoria College Site Act 
 Waihi Hospital District Act 
 Waikokopu Harbour Board Act 
 Waimarino County Act 
 Weber County Act 
 Wellington Harbour Board Empowering Act 
Plus 29 Acts amended and 2 Acts repealed.

1903  
 Arbitration Court Emergency Act 
 Australian and New Zealand Naval Defence Act 
 Borough of Dannevirke Electric Power and Loan Empowering Act 
 Borough of Gore Electric Power Empowering Act 
 Bush and Swamp Crown Lands Settlement Act 
 Carterton Borough Water-supply Act 
 City of Auckland Empowering Act 
 City of Christchurch Special Loans Enabling Act 
 City Single Electorates Act 
 Clutha Floods Relief Fund Trustees Empowering Act 
 Coastwise Trade Act 
 Collingwood County Act 
 Commissioners Act 
 Dairy Industry Act Extension Act 
 Dramatic Copyright Act 
 Dunedin City and Suburban Tramways and Water-power Act  Amended: 1911
 General Assembly Library Act 
 Gore Athenaeum Reserve Vesting and Empowering Act 
 Government Railways Superannuation Fund Contributions Act 
 Grand Lodge of Freemasons of New Zealand Trustees Act  Amended: 1957/64
 Huirangi Domain and Huirangi Institute Empowering Act 
 Hutt Mechanics' Institute Sale Act 
 Hutt Railway and Road Improvement Act  Amended: 1911/19
 Hutt Road Act  Amended: 1917/22
 Intestates' Estates Act 
 Juvenile Smoking Suppression Act 
 Kawhia and Awakino Counties Act 
 Labour Department Act  Amended: 1936/70/73/79/85
 Masterton Hospital Contributors Empowering Act 
 Mokau River Trust Act 
 Mutual Fire Insurance Act  Amended: 1913/25/34
 National Scholarships Act 
 New Plymouth Borough and Taranaki Hospital Exchange Act 
 Otago Dock Trust Electric Lighting Act 
 Paeroa-Waihi Railway Act 
 Patea Harbour Board Foreshore Act 
 Patriotic Funds Act 
 Port Chalmers Corporation Empowering Act 
 Poukawa Native Reserve Act  Amended: 1910
 Preferential and Reciprocal Trade Act 
 Presbyterian College Site Act 
 Products Export Act  Amended: 1929/35
 Public Loans Renewal Act 
 Queen's Scholarships Act 
 Road and Town Districts Rating Act 
 Sand-drift Act 
 Scenery Preservation Act  Amended: 1906/10/15/26/33
 School Committees' Funds Act 
 Secondary Schools Act 
 Shipping and Seaman Act 
 St Albans Special Loan Validation and Empowering Act 
 State Fire Insurance Act  Amended: 1912/22/28/62
 Taranaki and Hawera Hospital Districts Apportionment Act 
 Taranaki School Commissioners and Borough Exchange Act 
 Thames Harbour Board Empowering Act 
 Timaru Harbour District and Harbour Board Act 
 Timber Export Duty Act 
 Treasury Bills Extension Act 
 Waiapu Hospital District Act 
 Waihi Hospital Board Act 
 Waikokopu Harbour Act 
 Waimate County Water-races Validation Act 
 Wainono Drainage District Adjustment Act 
 Wanganui Suburbs Lighting Act 
 Water-power Act 
 Wellington City Recreation-ground Act 
 Wellington Corporation Leasing Act 
 Wellington Hospital Contributors Empowering Act 
 Whangarei Borough Repayment of Kensington Park Rate Enabling Act 
 Wireless Telegraphy Act 
Plus 42 Acts amended and 1 Act repealed.

1904  
 Ammunition-supply Act 
 Ashburton Water-supply Act 
 Auckland Harbour Board Loan and Empowering Act 
 Auckland Waterworks Extension Act 
 Borough of South Dunedin Empowering Act  Amended: 1909
 Carrington Compensation Award Satisfaction Act 
 Christchurch Domains Act  Amended: 1911/13/23/37/43
 Divorce and Matrimonial Causes Acts Compilation Act 
 Domain Boards Act 
 Education Acts Compilation Act 
 Fertilisers Act  Amended: 1962/72
 Hamilton Parsonage Site Act  Amended: 1937/94
 Hawke's Bay and Waipawa United District Charitable Aid Board Empowering Act 
 High Commissioner Act 
 Hokitika Harbour Board Empowering Act 
 Inglewood Town Board Leases Validation Act 
 Local Elections Act 
 Marriage Acts Compilation Act 
 Midwives Act 
 Native Land Duty Abolition Act 
 Native Land Rating Act 
 Nelson City Lands Vesting Act 
 Nelson Town School Site Exchange Act 
 New Zealand Loans Act  Amended: 1910/14/15/47/56/62/67/68/69
 Otago University Reserves Act 
 Public Officers' Appointment and Powers Act 
 Railway Service Computation Act 
 Railways Improvements Authorisation Act 
 Remuera Road District Borrowing Act 
 Roman Catholic Bishop of Christchurch Empowering Act 
 Shops and Offices Act  Amended: 1910/13/15/17/20/21/27/36/45/46/51/59/65/70/71/72/74/75/78
 South Canterbury Hospital and Charitable Aid Board Empowering Act 
 Stephen Cole Moule Trustees Empowering Act 
 Strafford Hospital District Act 
 Supreme Court Judges' Salaries Act 
 University Degrees Act 
 Waipori Falls Electrical Power Act 
 Waitara Harbour Board Foreshore Endowment Act 
 Waitomo County Act 
Plus 22 Acts amended

1905  
 Agricultural Implement Manufacture, Importation, and Sale Act 
 Auckland Cemetery Bridge and City Borrowing Act 
 Auckland Harbour Board and Devonport Borough Council Empowering Act 
 Borough of Birkenhead Enabling Act 
 Canterbury Agricultural College Reserves Act 
 Civil Service Classification Act 
 Coal-mines Acts Compilation Act 
 Dannevirke Education Reserve Transfer Act 
 Eastbourne Borough Act 
 Education Board of the District of Otago Empowering Act 
 Ellesmere Lands Drainage Act  Amended: 1912
 Eltham Borough Drainage and Water-supply Empowering Act 
 Eltham Public Hall Act 
 Epuni Leases Surrender Act 
 Evidence Act  Amended: 1926/45/50/52/58/62/63/66/72/73/74/76/77/80/82/85/86/87/88/89/90/94/95/98/2000/05/07
 Gerhard John Mueller Enabling Act 
 Havelock Harbour Board Act  Amended: 1910/53
 Hokitika Harbour Act  Amended: 1908
 Horowhenua Lake Act 
 Industrial Conciliation and Arbitration Acts Compilation Act 
 Invercargill Cemetery Vesting Act 
 Kaiapoi Native Reserve Act 
 Lyttelton Borough Council Foreshore Vesting Act 
 Lyttleton Harbour Board Land Act 
 Maori Land Settlement Act 
 Marriages Validation Act 
 Masterton Public Park Extension Act 
 Medical Practitioners Registration Act 
 Mining Acts Compilation Act 
 Motor Registration Act 
 Motueka Harbour Board Act  Amended: 1936
 Native Townships Local Government Act 
 Nelson Harbour Act  Amended: 1920
 New Zealand International Exhibition Empowering Act 
 Oamaru Borough Council Loan Act 
 Oamaru Volunteer Drill-shed Site Act 
 Oxford Road District Act 
 Paeroa Domain Loan Validation Act 
 Palmerston North High School Reserve Act 
 Petone and Hutt Corporations Empowering Act 
 Petone Borough Empowering Act 
 Petone Corporation Waterworks Act 
 Property Law Act  Amended: 1927/28/32/39/50/51/53/57/59/61/63/65/67/68/71/75/76/77/80/82/83/86/93/94/95
 Public Works Acts Compilation Act 
 Sentry Hill-New Plymouth Railway Deviation Act 
 Tapanui Commonage Reserve Act 
 Taranaki Scholarships Act 
 Teachers' Superannuation Act 
 Timaru Borough Drainage, Sewerage, and Loans Act 
 Timber and Flax Royalties Act 
 Waikaka Branch Railway Act 
 Wallace Hospital District Act 
 Wanganui Harbour Act 
 Wellington Hospital Contributors and Society for Relief of the Aged Needy Ex Act 
 Workers' Dwellings Act  Amended: 1914
Plus 30 Acts amended

1906  
 Apiaries Act  Amended: 1913/20/51/53/56/58/65/67/71/73/78/80
 Auckland Girls' Grammar School Act 
 Auckland Savings-bank Educational Special Donation Act 
 Bank-shares Transfer Act 
 Borough of Port Chalmers and Otago Dock Trust Exchange of Land Act 
 Christchurch Tramway District Act  Amended: 1910/21/26/27/32/39/49/50/51/54/60/63/66/70/74/75
 City of Dunedin Lands Vesting Act  Amended: 1965
 Customs Duties Adjustment Act 
 Eketahuna Borough Act 
 Eltham County Act 
 Fire Brigades Act  Amended: 1908/13/14/32
 Firearms Act 
 Gladstone Streets Vesting and Empowering Act 
 Government Advances to Workers Act 
 Greytown Trustees Empowering Act 
 Habitual Criminals and Offenders Act 
 Habitual Drunkards Act 
 Jubilee Institute for the Blind Act 
 Juvenile Offenders Act 
 Kensington Park Rate Exemption Act 
 Motor Regulation Act 
 Napier Athenaeum and Mechanics' Institute Empowering Act 
 Napier Harbour Board Exchange of Lands Empowering Act 
 Napier Hospital Site Extension Act 
 New Plymouth Borough and the Taranaki School Commissioners Exchange Act 
 New Zealand and South African Customs Duties Reciprocity Act 
 New Zealand International Exhibition Act 
 Onslow Borough Drainage Empowering Act 
 Otago Dock Validation Act 
 Otago Presbyterian Church Board of Property Act  Amended: 1884/1925/30/39/48
 Palmerston North Dairying School Act 
 Petone Borough Streets Act 
 Private Hospitals Act 
 Reserves and other Lands Disposal and Public Bodies Empowering Act 
 Roman Catholic Bishop of Auckland Empowering Act 
 Sale of Explosives Act 
 Sandy Point and Grasmere Domains Vesting Act 
 Savings-banks Profits Act 
 Scaffolding Inspection Act 
 South Island Landless Natives Act 
 State Coal-mines Account Act 
 Thames Deep Levels Enabling Act 
 Timaru Harbour District Act 
 Timaru Public Library Act 
 Tourist and Health Resorts Control Act  Amended: 1977
 Training-ships Act 
 Vincent and Maniototo Hospital Districts Act 
 Waimate Agricultural Reserve Dairy School Act 
 Waimumu Stream Drainage Act 
 Wellington City Reclamation and Empowering Act 
Plus 35 Acts amended

1907  
 Agricultural Labourers' Accommodation Act 
 Auckland Harbour Board and Birkenhead Borough Empowering Act 
 Butter Export Act 
 Canterbury College Endowment Act 
 Co-operative Dairy Companies Act  Amended: 1950/51/56/76/78
 Dunedin Suburban Gas Company Empowering Act 
 Flour and other Products Monopoly Prevention Act 
 Foreign Tribunals Evidence Act 
 Gisborne Harbour Board Enabling Act  Amended: 1922
 Gore Agricultural and Pastoral Association Vesting and Enabling Act 
 Gore Streets Act 
 Hastings Recreation Reserve Act 
 Hutt Park Act  Amended: 1914
 Levin Borough Reserves Vesting and Empowering Act 
 Makara County Act 
 Maniototo Hospital and Charitable Aid Act 
 Marine Insurance Act  Amended: 1975
 Methylated Spirit Act 
 National Endowment Act 
 Native Land Settlement Act 
 Nelson Hospital and Charitable Aid Board Empowering Act 
 Nelson Institute Act 
 New Plymouth Borough Electric and Waterworks Loans Validation Act 
 New Zealand and South African Customs Treaty Ratification Act 
 Ngatimaru Landless Natives Act 
 Otaki and Porirua Empowering Act 
 Packet Licenses Act 
 Parliamentary and Executive Titles Act 
 Petone Water-supply Conservation Act 
 Post and Telegraph Classification Act 
 Post-Office Savings-Bank Funds Investment Act 
 Public Service Classification Act 
 Public Service Superannuation Act 
 Purangi Landless Natives Act 
 Rangitatau Block Exchange Act 
 Reserve Fund Securities Act 
 Rotorua Town Act 
 Taieri Land Drainage Act  Amended: 1914
 Tapanui Hospital Reserve Vesting Act 
 Tariff Act  Amended: 1989/90/91/94
 Taumarunui Town Council Election Validation Act 
 Tohunga Suppression Act 
 Waipawa Borough Act 
 Waipawa County Act 
 Waipukurau County Act 
 Wairau Harbour Board Act 
 Waitara Harbour District and Empowering Act 
 Whangamomona County Act 
 Whangarei Harbour Act 
Plus 34 Acts amended and 1 Act repealed.

1908  
 Auckland and Manukau Canal Act 
 Auckland University College Land Act 
 Carterton Borough Council Vesting and Enabling Act 
 Christchurch City Betterment Act 
 Christchurch City Sanitation Empowering Act  Amended: 1922/27
 Consolidated Statutes Enactment Act 
 Declaratory Judgments Act  Amended: 1966
 Education Reserves Leases Validation and Empowering Act 
 Gonville and Castlecliff Tramway District Act 
 Gore Public Library Vesting Act 
 Hauraki Plains Act  Amended: 1911/12/13/14/22
 Hawera Technical School Site Exchange Act 
 Hutt Valley Tramway District Act 
 Inangahua County Empowering Act 
 Incorporated Societies Act  Amended: 1920/22/30/51/53/65/71/76/81/83/93/2005
 Land-tax Income-tax Act 
 Lincoln Road Board Empowering Act 
 Local Authorities Superannuation Act  Amended: 1912/24
 Local Authorities' Indemnity Act 
 Matamata County Act 
 Meikle Acquittal Act 
 Mental Hospitals Reserves Act 
 Murchison County Act 
 Napier Public Baths Act 
 Naval Subsidy Act 
 New Plymouth Harbour Board Empowering Act  Amended: 1952
 New Zealand Society of Accountants Act  Amended: 1909/13/15/63/68/71/74/77/78/82/92/93
 Oamaru Reserves Act 
 Ohakune Town Board Election Validation Act 
 Ohura County Act 
 Opunake Harbour Act  Amended: 1909/12
 Otago Dock Trust Merger Act  Amended: 1909
 Otago Heads Native Reserve Road Act 
 Palmerston North Dairy School Reserve Act 
 Public Bodies' Leases Act  Amended: 1914
 Quackery Prevention Act 
 Roman Catholic Archbishop of Wellington Empowering Act 
 Ross Goldfields Electric Power Transmission Act 
 Second Ballot Act 
 Taupo No 2 Block Act 
 Validation Court Empowering Act 
 Waikohu County Act 
 Waimate West County Act 
 Waipuka Block Road Revesting Act 
 Wellington and Manawatu Railway Purchase Act 
 Whakatane Foreshore Reclamation Act 
 Whangarei Abattoir Site Act 
 Workers' Compensation Act  Amended: 1909/11/13/20/26/36/43/45/47/49/50/51/52/53/54/58/59/60/62/63/64/66/67/68/69/70/71/72/78/80
Plus 33 Acts amended

1909  
 Auckland City Loans Consolidation and Empowering Act 
 City of Auckland Enabling Act 
 Death Duties Act  Amended: 1911/20/23/25/26/50/52/53
 Ellesmere Domain Board Empowering Act 
 Finance Act 
 Grey Lynn Domain Vesting Act 
 Heathcote Road Board Waterworks Act 
 Inferior Courts Procedure Act  Amended: 1979
 Inglewood Technical-school Site Act 
 King-country Licenses Act 
 Kiwitea County Validation Act 
 Land for Settlements Administration Act 
 Land Settlement Finance Act  Amended: 1910
 Masterton Trust Lands Exchange Act 
 McLean Institute Act 
 Naval Defence Act  Amended: 1922/36/50/51
 New Plymouth Harbour Reclamation Act 
 New Plymouth Recreation and Racecourse Reserve Exchange Act 
 New Zealand State-guaranteed Advances Act  Amended: 1910/11/12
 Otago Dock Trust Lands Reclamation and Street-widening Act 
 Otago Hospital Board Kaitangata Reserve Vesting Act 
 Race Meetings Act 
 Reefton Recreation Reserve Act 
 Reformatory Institutions Act  Amended: 1918/32
 Roman Catholic Archbishop Empowering Act 
 Roman Catholic Bishop of Auckland Special Powers Act 
 Rotoiti Validation Act 
 Taranaki Agricultural Society Empowering Act 
 Tawera County Act 
 Timaru Borough Loans Consolidation Act 
 Tokomaru Freezing-works Site Act 
 Waimairi County Act 
 Waipara County Act 
 Waipukurau Reserve Act 
 Wairewa County Act 
 Waitara Borough Reserves Vesting Act 
 Wanganui Roman Catholic Lands Act 
 Wanganui School Sites Act  Amended: 1911/13
Plus 19 Acts amended

1910s

1910  
 Aid to Water-power Works Act 
 By-laws Act 
 Census and Statistics Act  Amended: 1915
 Commercial Trusts Act 
 Exhibitions Act  Amended: 1963
 Fruit-farms Settlement Act 
 Greymouth Harbour Board Loans Consolidation Act  Amended: 1910
 Hastings Borough Loan Empowering Act 
 Horowhenua County Loan Act 
 Inalienable Life Annuities Act 
 Indecent Publications Act 1910  Amended: 1954/58/61/72/77/82/83/86
 Invercargill Tramway Buildings and Works Site Act 
 Kaiapoi Reserve Act 
 Kaitieke County Act 
 Land-tax and income-tax Act 
 Lyttelton Harbour Board Reclamation and Empowering Act 
 National Provident Fund Act  Amended: 1914/15/19/25/31/42/46/54/55/56/57/58/59/60/61/62/63/64/65/66/67/71/72/76/77/82/83/88
 Nelson City Drainage Loan and Empowering Act 
 Oamaru Harbour Board Enabling Act 
 Otago Harbour Board Lands Vesting Act 
 Phosphorus Matches Act 
 Public Debt Extinction Act 
 Public Holidays Act  Amended: 1921/48/62
 Rangitaiki Land Drainage Act  Amended: 1913/14/23/48/57/69
 Secret Commissions Act 
 Selwyn County Subdivision Act 
 Stone-quarries Act  Amended: 1911/20/22
 Taranaki Scholarships Endowment Act 
 Templeton Domain Alteration of Boundaries Act 
 Thermal Springs Districts Act 
 Waihou and Ohinemuri Rivers Improvement Act  Amended: 1912/58
 Waikouaiti County Council Reserve Vesting Act 
 Waitara Harbour Board and Borough Empowering Act 
 Wanganui Church Acre Act  Amended: 1917/31
 Wanganui Harbour Board Vesting Act 
 Wellington City Milk-supply Act  Amended: 1914/26/33
 Woodville Borough Drainage Empowering Act 
 Wyndham Showground Reserve Act 
Plus 59 Acts amended and 1 Act repealed.

1911  
 Ashley Subdivision, and the Waimakariri-Ashley Water-supply Board Act 
 Auckland Electric-power Station Site Act 
 Auckland Grammar School Site Act 
 Awatere County Act 
 City of Christchurch Empowering Act 
 Dunedin Technical School Site Act 
 Elingamite Rehearing Act 
 Franklin and Manukau Counties Act 
 Greytown Town Lands and Hospital Lands Exchange Act 
 Hamilton Domains Act  Amended: 1922
 Heathcote County Boundary Act 
 Invercargill Reserves Vesting Act 
 Kaikoura Hospital Site Act 
 Little River Domain Board Act 
 Lyttelton Borough Extension Act  Amended: 1915
 Manukau Harbour Control Act 
 Mental Defectives Act  Amended: 1914/21/28/35/50/51
 Methodist Charitable and Educational Trusts Act  Amended: 1971/76/88
 Methodist Church of New Zealand Act 
 Mosgiel Borough Empowering Act 
 Oamaru Municipal Exchange and Market Reserve Leasing Act 
 Onehunga Borough Vesting Act  Amended: 1957
 Papakaio Water-race District Validation Act 
 Patents, Designs, and Trade-marks Act  Amended: 1913/14/24/29/39/43/46/47
 Portobello Road District Lands Vesting Act 
 Representation Commissions' Reports Validation Act 
 Riverton Harbour Loan and Empowering Act 
 Ross Borough Council Vesting and Empowering Act  Amended: 1912
 Sir Donald McLean Memorial Park Act 
 Tapanui Commonage Reserve Exchange and Leasing Act 
 University of Otago Council Act 
 Waikoikoi Public Hall Transfer Act 
 Waikowhai Park Act 
 Wanganui River Bridge No 2 Act 
 Widows' Pensions Act  Amended: 1912
Plus 29 Acts amended

1912  
 Aged and Infirm Persons Protection Act  Amended: 1957/69/75
 Akaroa and Wainui Road District, Akaroa County, and Wairewa County Alteration o Act 
 Auckland Education Reserves Act 
 Barmaids Registration Act 
 Country Telephones-lines Act 
 Deputy Governor's Powers Act 
 Land Agents Act  Amended: 1955/56/59/61
 Mokau Harbour Board Empowering Act 
 New Plymouth Huatoki Stream Diversion and Exchange Act 
 Oamaru King George's Park Reserve Vesting Act 
 Plumbers Registration Act  Amended: 1950/55
 Public Service Act  Amended: 1927/46/50/51/52/54/59/60
 Tatum Trust Revocation Act 
 Tauranga Harbour Act  Amended: 1917
 Thomas George Macarthy Trust Act  Amended: 1972
 Waimairi County Differential Rate Empowering Act 
 Wellington and Karori Sanitation and Water-supply Act  Amended: 1915
 Westland Hospital and Charitable Aid Board Vesting and Empowering Act 
 Whakatane Harbour Act  Amended: 1915/16/17/20/22/28/50
Plus 49 Acts amended

See also 
The above list may not be current and will contain errors and omissions. For more accurate information try:
 Walter Monro Wilson, The Practical Statutes of New Zealand, Auckland: Wayte and Batger 1867
 The Knowledge Basket: Legislation NZ
 New Zealand Legislation Includes some Imperial and Provincial Acts. Only includes Acts currently in force, and as amended.
 Legislation Direct List of statutes from 2003 to order

Lists of statutes of New Zealand